Best of Bowie is a 2002 greatest hits album by English recording artist David Bowie. Released in October after the critical and commercial success of the Heathen album released four months earlier, the songs range from his second album, David Bowie (1969) to Heathen (2002). A DVD, also titled Best of Bowie, was also released. 

Initially peaking at number 11 on the UK Albums Chart upon release in October 2002, the album entered the top 10 for the first time in January 2016, after Bowie's death, and reached a new peak of number 1, marking Bowie's eleventh UK number-one album. It also became the first album to reach number 1 in the UK due to streaming. Best of Bowie has been certified 4× Platinum by the British Phonographic Industry for sales of over 1,200,000.

CD release
In each of the 21 territories that Best of Bowie was released, it was given its own track listing, based upon which songs were most popular in that region. In some countries, two versions were available – single-disc and double-disc versions. In all, 63 tracks appear in at least one of the different releases. The country the edition came from can be identified by a small national flag on the spine, except for the Argentine/Mexican, Eastern European and UK editions, which are "flag-less". Some regions included rare versions of some songs, such as the New Zealand version, which included a previously unreleased 4:01 edit of "Magic Dance" (1986) (mis-labeled as the 'single version'), and the Chilean edition which included the first-ever CD release of the single version of "Underground" (1986).

DVD release
This release superseded previous video releases (such as Bowie – The Video Collection (1993)) and was, at the time, described as the "most extensive collection of Bowie videos yet released." Videos were restored and remastered at Abbey Road Interactive. The DVD also included extensive easter eggs including live, remixed and alternate versions of some songs, hidden by navigating the DVD in specific ways.

The videos for "China Girl", "Loving the Alien", "Day-In Day-Out", and "The Hearts Filthy Lesson" are the censored versions of the original videos.

2003 and 2004 re-releases
In November 2003, the US/Canada single-disc version was re-released to include a new bonus DVD which included new audio and video remixes from Club Bowie (2003). In 2004, to coincide with Bowie's A Reality Tour reaching the Far East, an "Asian Tour Edition" was released that combined the original UK release with the bonus DVD as well.

Chart performance
Initially peaking at number 11 in October 2002 on the UK Albums Chart, the album entered the top 10 for the first time in January 2016, following Bowie's death. On 5 February, after his final album Blackstar had spent three weeks at the top, Best of Bowie reached a new peak of number 1, marking Bowie's eleventh UK number-one album and making him the first artist to replace themselves at number 1 with a different album since Michael Jackson did it after his own death in 2009. It also became the first album to reach number 1 in the UK on streams alone.

Track listings
All tracks written by David Bowie except as noted.
Track listings note: The first unique track reference contains all information pertaining to that song and version, including song writing credits, source and length. Subsequent references only mention song and version unless where noted.

UK and rest of Europe except Belgium, Germany, Switzerland, Austria, and Denmark (2 CD)
CD: EMI / 5 39821 2 (UK) // EMI 7243 5 39821 2 6 (Europe)

CD 1

CD 2

US and Canada (1 CD Version)
CD: Virgin-EMI / 5 41929 2 (US) // EMI 7243 5 42244 2 5 (Canada)

US and Canada (2 CD Version)
CD: Virgin-EMI / 7243 5 41930 2 (US) // EMI 7243 5 42244 2 3 (Canada)

CD 1

CD 2

Belgium (1 CD)
CD: EMI / 5 41888 2 (Belgium)

Germany, Switzerland and Austria (1 CD)
CD: EMI / 5 41912 2 (Germany/Switzerland/Austria)

Denmark (2 CD)
CD: EMI / 5 41918 2 (Denmark)

CD 1

CD 2

Australia (1 CD)
CD: EMI / 7243 5 42075 2 (Australia)

New Zealand (2 CD)
CD: EMI 7243 5 39821 2 6 (New Zealand)

CD 1

CD 2

Colombia, Ecuador, Peru and Venezuela (1 CD)
CD: EMI 7243541900-2 (Colombia/Ecuador/Peru/Venezuela)

Hong Kong (3 CD)
CD: EMI / 5 77949 2 (Hong Kong)

CD 1

CD 2

CD 3

 Album released in 2004.

Argentina and Mexico (1 CD)
CD: EMI / 7243 5 41916 2 6 (Argentina/Mexico)

Brazil (1 CD)
CD: EMI / 7243 5 41899 2 0 (Brazil)

Japan and Thailand (1 CD)
CD: Toshiba-EMI / TOCP-67061 (Japan/Thailand)

US (2003 Limited Edition 1 CD with bonus DVD)
CD same as 2002 US and Canada 1 CD version
Bonus DVD: / Virgin/EMI 5 95692 0 (US)

DVD track listing

DVD content identical worldwide

DVD 1

DVD 2

Easter egg access
The "easter eggs" on this DVD may be accessed by following the sequence of navigation steps listed below, or in DVD players or playback software which ignore user operation prohibitions, these "easter eggs" can be accessed directly by jumping to the DVD Title number listed.

DVD 1
"Oh! You Pretty Things" (take 1) (alternate take from The Old Grey Whistle Test)
Select 'play all'. Every 2nd time the whole DVD plays through, the alternate version will appear in place of the broadcast version of the song. If you don't want to wait, just skip through all of the chapters.
Alternatively, jump directly to Title 2 Chapter 1.
Interview with Russell Harty
Highlight "Drive-In Saturday" on the track listing display, and then press the 'right' button where an underscore (_) will appear. Now press 'enter'.
Alternatively, jump directly to Title 30.
Ad for the forthcoming Ziggy Stardust and the Spiders from Mars: The Motion Picture DVD (2003)
Select the lightning bolt to the right of "Ziggy Stardust" on the track listing display.  This is a still advertisement, not a video.
Jazzin' For Blue Jean (full promotional video for "Blue Jean")
Highlight the track and press 'right'. Select the ')' symbol on the track listing display. The image to the right will change. Select the new image. The image can be toggled back and forth by pressing the ')' image.
Alternatively, jump directly to Title 31.
"Blue Jean" (alternate version for MTV), recorded at The Wag Club, Soho, London
This has to be activated during the Easter egg Jazzin' For Blue Jean video. Right after the girl approaches the jukebox to start the video, as soon as Bowie appears on the TV above the jukebox (approximately 1:40 into the film), press 'enter'. If using a computer for playback, you can click on the TV screen Bowie appears in.
Alternatively, jump directly to Title 32.

DVD 2
"Day-In Day-Out" (7” dance edit)
The 7” Dance Edit will appear every second time you select "Day-In, Day-Out" from the track listing menu.
Alternatively, jump directly to Title 24.
"Miracle Goodnight" (remix)
This has to be activated after playback of the 'Miracle Goodnight' video. Wait 5 minutes on the track list display and press enter.
Alternatively, jump directly to Title 23.
"Seven Years in Tibet" (Mandarin version)
Play the video for "Seven Years in Tibet." Three seconds after the video starts a subtitle will appear. Press 'enter' and this will switch versions. Pressing 'enter' again at the same time will toggle the version back to English.
Alternatively, jump directly to Title 25.
"Survive" (live version)
Select 'play all'. Every 2nd time the whole DVD plays through, the live version will appear in place of the other version of the song. If you don't want to wait, just skip through all of the chapters.
Alternatively, jump directly to Title 2 Chapter 20.

Charts

Weekly charts

Year-end charts

Certifications

Album

DVD

References

External links
 Track listing variations: 

2002 greatest hits albums
David Bowie video albums
David Bowie compilation albums
2002 video albums
Music video compilation albums
2002 remix albums
EMI Records compilation albums
EMI Records remix albums
EMI Records video albums
Virgin Records remix albums
Virgin Records compilation albums
Virgin Records video albums